Suhail Iftikhar (born 9 September 1986) is a cricketer who plays for Norway. He played for Norway the 2015 ICC World Cricket League Division Six tournament in England. He also played for Norway in Group C of the 2018–19 ICC T20 World Cup Europe Qualifier tournament in the Netherlands.

References

External links
 

1986 births
Living people
Norwegian cricketers
Place of birth missing (living people)